Ann Morgan Guilbert (October 16, 1928 – June 14, 2016), sometimes credited as Ann Guilbert, was an American television and film actress and comedian who portrayed a number of roles from the 1950s on, most notably as Millie Helper in 61 episodes of the early 1960s sitcom The Dick Van Dyke Show, and later Yetta Rosenberg, Fran Fine's doddering grandmother, in 56 episodes of the 1990s sitcom The Nanny.

Life and career
Guilbert was born in Minneapolis, Minnesota, the daughter of Dr. Gerald Guilbert, a physician, and his wife, Cornelia (née Morgan). Her paternal grandfather, Lionel Guilbert, was an immigrant from England.

She attended Solomon Juneau High School and after moving to San Francisco studied theater arts at Stanford University. She began her career as a featured performer and singer in the Billy Barnes Revues of the 1950s and 1960s.

After The Dick Van Dyke Show, she made guest appearances in many other television shows, including Adam-12 (the premiere episode); as well as The Andy Griffith Show; Love, American Style; That Girl; I Dream of Jeannie; Dragnet; Picket Fences; Seinfeld; Curb Your Enthusiasm and Law & Order: Special Victims Unit. From 1993 to 1999, she appeared as Yetta Rosenberg on The Nanny. In December 2004, she appeared in the reunion of The Nanny titled The Nanny Reunion: A Nosh to Remember with Fran Drescher and other cast members of The Nanny.

She appeared in such feature films as A Guide for the Married Man, Viva Max!, Grumpier Old Men (as the mother of Sophia Loren's character), and Please Give, for which she received the CFA for Best Supporting Actress.

Personal life
Guilbert was married to writer and producer George Eckstein from 1951 until their divorce in 1966. They had two children together, actress Hallie Todd and acting coach Nora Eckstein. Her second marriage, to Guy Raymond, lasted from 1967 until his death in 1997.

Death
Guilbert died of pancreatic cancer in Los Angeles on June 14, 2016, aged 87. An episode of Life in Pieces was dedicated to her memory.

Filmography

Film

Television

Stage

References

External links
 
 

1928 births
2016 deaths
20th-century American actresses
21st-century American actresses
Actresses from Minneapolis
American women singers
American film actresses
American stage actresses
American television actresses
American people of English descent
Deaths from pancreatic cancer
Deaths from cancer in California
Musicians from Minneapolis
Stanford University alumni
Singers from Minnesota